The 2022 Malaysia Open (officially known as the Petronas Malaysia Open 2022 for sponsorship reasons) was a badminton tournament that took place at the Axiata Arena, Kuala Lumpur, Malaysia, from 28 June to 3 July 2022 and had a total prize of US$675,000. This was the first edition to take place since 2019.

Viktor Axelsen continued his dominance in the men's singles with a third consecutive title in a month, having won the Indonesia Masters and Indonesia Open. Ratchanok Intanon won her first World Tour tournament title since the 2020 Indonesia Masters. Takuro Hoki and Yugo Kobayashi won their first Malaysia Open title, and so did Apriyani Rahayu and Siti Fadia Silva Ramadhanti. The latter's win was Indonesia's first title in Malaysia Open women's doubles since 1967. In mixed doubles, Zheng Siwei and Huang Yaqiong retained the title for the third consecutive edition; Zheng became the most successful mixed doubles player in the tournament's history with four titles in a row, having also won in 2017.

Tournament
The 2022 Malaysia Open was the twelfth tournament of the 2022 BWF World Tour and was part of the Malaysia Open championships, which had been held since 1937. This tournament was organized by the Badminton Association of Malaysia with sanction from the BWF.

Venue
This international tournament was held at the Axiata Arena inside the KL Sports City in Kuala Lumpur, Malaysia.

Point distribution
Below is the point distribution table for each phase of the tournament based on the BWF points system for the BWF World Tour Super 750 event.

Prize pool
The total prize money was US$650,000 with the distribution of the prize money in accordance with BWF regulations.

Men's singles

Seeds 

 Viktor Axelsen (champion)
 Kento Momota (final)
 Anders Antonsen (withdrew)
 Chou Tien-chen (second round)
 Lee Zii Jia (second round)
 Anthony Sinisuka Ginting (quarter-finals)
 Jonatan Christie (semi-finals)
 Lakshya Sen (withdrew)

Finals

Top half

Section 1

Section 2

Bottom half

Section 3

Section 4

Women's singles

Seeds 

 Akane Yamaguchi (first round)
 Tai Tzu-ying (semi-finals)
 An Se-young (second round)
 Chen Yufei (final)
 Carolina Marín (second round)
 Nozomi Okuhara (quarter-finals)
 P. V. Sindhu (quarter-finals)
 Ratchanok Intanon (champion)

Finals

Top half

Section 1

Section 2

Bottom half

Section 3

Section 4

Men's doubles

Seeds 

 Marcus Fernaldi Gideon / Kevin Sanjaya Sukamuljo (withdrew)
 Takuro Hoki / Yugo Kobayashi (champions)
 Mohammad Ahsan / Hendra Setiawan (quarter-finals)
 Lee Yang / Wang Chi-lin (second round)
 Aaron Chia / Soh Wooi Yik (semi-finals)
 Fajar Alfian / Muhammad Rian Ardianto (final)
 Satwiksairaj Rankireddy / Chirag Shetty (second round)
 Kim Astrup / Anders Skaarup Rasmussen (first round)

Finals

Top half

Section 1

Section 2

Bottom half

Section 3

Section 4

Women's doubles

Seeds 

 Chen Qingchen / Jia Yifan (quarter-finals)
 Lee So-hee / Shin Seung-chan (second round)
 Kim So-yeong / Kong Hee-yong (withdrew)
 Yuki Fukushima / Sayaka Hirota (withdrew)
 Mayu Matsumoto / Wakana Nagahara (semi-finals)
 Nami Matsuyama / Chiharu Shida (second round)
 Jongkolphan Kititharakul / Rawinda Prajongjai (first round)
 Gabriela Stoeva / Stefani Stoeva (second round)

Finals

Top half

Section 1

Section 2

Bottom half

Section 3

Section 4

Mixed doubles

Seeds 

 Dechapol Puavaranukroh / Sapsiree Taerattanachai (final)
 Zheng Siwei / Huang Yaqiong (champions)
 Yuta Watanabe / Arisa Higashino (first round)
 Wang Yilyu / Huang Dongping (semi-finals)
 Praveen Jordan / Melati Daeva Oktavianti (withdrew)
 Tang Chun Man / Tse Ying Suet (quarter-finals)
 Tan Kian Meng / Lai Pei Jing (first round)
 Thom Gicquel / Delphine Delrue (quarter-finals)

Finals

Top half

Section 1

Section 2

Bottom half

Section 3

Section 4

References

External links
 Tournament Link

Malaysia Open (badminton)
Malaysia Open
Malaysia Open
Malaysia Open
Malaysia Open